David Revoy (born in 1981 in Reims) is a French artist best known as the creator of the free webcomic series Pepper&Carrot which is translated into 27 languages to a degree of 90 percent or more. It is published as books via Glénat.

After work in traditional painting, Revoy started using digital tools in 2003 and moved to use free and open-source software around 2009.

Revoy publishes a great deal of his work under free licenses, allowing his work to be remixed even for commercial use. This has led to derivations of mainly Pepper&Carrot such as animated films, cosplay, a card game and several video games. Revoy has expressed excitement about the derivations and often links to them from his web page. He has interpreted freely licensed works and works in the public domain. In 2010 he was awarded the CG Choice Award for an illustration of Alice in Wonderland. One of his most famous works is "Yin and Yang of world hunger", a remix of the yin and yang symbol.

He has published several tutorials, time-lapse videos, and speed-painting videos showing his work process and has described his hardware and software setup.

Early work 
Revoy started as a street portraitist in Avignon at the age of 18. Later he worked in traditional painting, illustration, concept art and teaching. In 2003 he ended his career as a traditional painter and started working with digital tools.

Film work 
In 2009–2010, Revoy worked as art director on the Blender short film Sintel, which was the first major project that used free software to produce free culture that Revoy encountered. He would later also work on the Blender films Tears of Steel, and Cosmos Laundromat,

Pepper&Carrot 

In May 2014, after more than 10 years of freelance work, Revoy published the first episode of the webcomic Pepper&Carrot. Pepper is a young orphan witch disciple at Chaosah, the smallest of the six schools of magic on the magical planet Hereva. She is aided by her cat Carrot, and lives with her mentors Thyme, Cayenne, and Cumin in a house in the forest of Squirrel's End. Her peers are Saffron, Shichimi, Coriander, and Camomile. Revoy aims for each episode to contain a small story arc where a character evolves and learns. The story bible is available on the website.

The webcomic is free (CC-BY) and is financed using crowdfunding. Revoy suggests the business model allows the comic to stay independent and doesn't have to resort to advertising. Revoy publishes all panels for the comic and often publishes links from his blog to derivations of the comic and characters, such as short animated films, cosplay, a card game and several video games. Revoy has expressed excitement that his work is re-used, saying "I'll never regret making Pepper&Carrot so open." and that he is happy to see other people make money from it. On the webcomic's webpage he extensively explains his philosophy, the reasons for wanting to cut out intermediaries between artist and audience, and why he does not put any content behind a paywall. He attributes some of the success of the webcomic to the release of its source, and highlighted the translations into some 50 languages. Reviews of the text in the speech balloons, and the translations, are performed in GitLab using Markdown.

When the publisher Glénat reached out to Revoy about publishing Pepper&Carrot, he declined their offer of a traditional contract with royalty payments in favor of keeping the Creative Commons attribution license, something that caused confusion in the legal and financial departments of the publisher. Glénat then offered to be the top patron of the webcomic, and Revoy retained the copyright and creative control over it. He considers Glénat's published books as just one of many other derivative works of the webcomic.

About working on the webcomic, Revoy said in 2015 that it was a dream come true and that "Every artist I know would love to make their own comics. Would love to get paid for making it, and to keep the control of it".

Free software and work process 

Revoy uses free and open-source software (FOSS) but even since having paid more than €3000 on software licenses for proprietary software, he rejects the notion that it is primarily a question about money. Though practicality, low cost and possibility to work on lower end hardware were initial motivators for Revoy to move from proprietary software to free software, in 2020 he said that there were even better reasons. He rather refers to the benefits of control, performance and standards, transparency, and control over data and privacy. Among the cons he lists that he now depends on hardware being compatible with Linux, wich may be more difficult to find and not well documented.

In a 2016 interview, Revoy conveyed that he used Photoshop and Corel Painter for 10 years (and Manga Studio and Sony Vegas) until a computer purchase in 2009 which included Windows Vista, which in turn required he buy upgrades for proprietary software, which totaled to an investment of a full month's salary, just for compatibility and with no additional features. Revoy commented on the experience saying "That was a really bad week: [I] had to spend a lot of money and my productivity was totally ruined."

He sold the new computer and bought one that could still run Windows XP, but realized it was not a viable long-term solution. He configured a dual boot with Linux Mint 4.0, compiled Wacom driver, modified Xorg, and wrote a Xsetwacom script to handle his Cintiq 12Wx. He kept Photoshop CS2 running on Wine to handle CMYK and files from publishers.

He then switched to Linux and got involved in free software projects like MyPaint and Gimp-painter (a fork of GIMP), and later Krita. Other than just use Krita, he reported bugs (over 200 bugs as of May 2015), helped other artists with it, and demonstrated new features.

In 2012 he started using Krita exclusively and in 2016 he had his own render farm that he used for rendering the pages of Pepper & Carrot, then ImageMagick and Inkscape glue speech bubbles to the images on the render farm. Using a GitHub repository, Revoy collaborates with the translators and other parts of the community and shares assets.

Other work and use

Revoy mostly creates original work, but also remixes other public domain and free works, for example Alice in Wonderland or Wikipe-tan. One of his most famous works is "Yin and Yang of World Hunger", a 2010 remix of the yin and yang symbol, which generated both admiration and negative comments.

Revoy's images has been used in research described as "training a computer to turn pencil sketches into cleaned line-art." In 2022, Revoy had noted that his 2006 work "Narcissus & Echo" was popular among scholars, and for use in theses and books about mythology, but tracking royalties and granting permissions for editing it was becoming cumbersome. He then remixed the 2006 image with some retouches and updates before releasing the remix under a more free license.

On his blog, he publishes many of his works, often in high resolution and under permissive Creative Commons licenses. Some work, which Revoy prefers not be used for commercial or political purposes without his approval, are published under a more restrictive license.

Revoy publishes tutorials, time-lapse videos, and speed-painting videos showing his work process. He has published descriptions of his hardware and software setup.

He expressed admiration for artists like Yoshitaka Amano who are able to work in several fields.

In 2015, Revoy expressed a long-term vision to create an animation studio which only produces works under free licenses. For the top tier, named "Hereva studio", on one of Revoy's crowdfunding sites, Revoy aspires to hire CG professionals to make an animated web series and an open online school.

Financing 
To finance his work, Revoy accepts donations via Patreon, Liberapay, Tipeee, PayPal, and wire transfers.

Image gallery 

1. Concept art for the animated short film Sintel (2010)
2. A 2018 illustration of Pepper and Carrot
3. A time lapse video by Revoy, showing his work process
4. 2010 artwork from the Open Movie Workshop "Chaos&Evolutions" about digital painting
5. "Mission" (2011), an illustration of a futuristic aircraft on a landing pad
6. "The after rain smell" (2023) illustrating petrichor
7. The character Carrot in an illustration of several paywalls
8. "Liberapay Lantern" (2017) illustrating Revoy finances his work via donations
9. "Electron Donor" (2010), a sci-fi illustration for which Revoy drew inspiration from Blade Runner, Miyasaki, and Pixar
10. "Narcissus & Echo", a 2022 remix of Revoy's own work from 2006
11. "Grow your own ideas" (2013), a plea to, when forming an opinion, doing so independently

References

External links 

 davidrevoy.com – David Revoy's blog
 peppercarrot.com – the official Pepper&Carrot webpage

1981 births
Living people
21st-century French artists
French comics writers
French comics artists
Fantasy artists
Science fiction artists